Nostradamus's Traité des fardemens et confitures, variously entitled Moult utile opuscule... and Le vrai et parfaict embellissement de la face..., was first published in 1555, even though it contained a Proem, or prologue, dated 1552. Clearly the work of an apothecary, it contained recipes for preparing cosmetics and preserves, the latter based largely on sugar, which was controlled at the time by the apothecaries' guilds.

Content
Among the topics covered (which include removing spots from the face with mercury) were:

A. THE COSMETICS MANUAL
 Chapter VI: To make a perfect nutmeg oil
 Chapter VIII [the one giving Nostradamus’s famous plague remedy]: To make the basis of a perfectly good and excellent aromatic powder
 Chapter X: To make a sweet smelling, long lasting paste
 Chapter XI: Another method for making aromatic balls
 Chapter XIII: Powder for cleaning and whitening the teeth
 Chapter XIIII: Another more excellent method for cleaning the teeth, even rotten ones [by filing them down]
 Chapter XV: Perfumed water for impregnating the shapes or forms mentioned above
 Chapter XVIII (1556): To truly make the lovers’ sexual potion which the ancients used for love-making
 Chapter XXIIII: How to make the hair golden blond
 Chapter XXVI [often erroneously described as for an aphrodisiac: A supreme and very useful composition for the health of the human body
 Chapter XXVII: There follows the way in which one should use the above mentioned composition

B. THE COOKBOOK
 Chapter III: To make candied orange peel, using sugar or honey
 Chapter VIII: How to make a jam or preserve with heart cherries
 Chapter XV: To make a quince jelly of superb beauty, goodness, flavour and excellence fit to set before a King
 Chapter XXIIII: To preserve pears
 Chapter XXV: To make a very fine sugar candy
 Chapter XXVII: To make marzipan
 Chapter XXIX: To make a laxative rose syrup

The book was translated into German in 1574, then the German was revised in 1994, and finally the German was translated into English under the title The Elixirs of Nostradamus (Moyer Bell, 1996). Needless to say, the fourth-hand results of this process were unreliable, if not downright dangerous: the term roses rouges incarnées, for example, was routinely translated as 'black orchids', and urines (urine) came out as 'drinking wells'.

References

Sources

 Lemesurier, P., The Nostradamus Encyclopedia (Godsfield/St Martin’s, 1997)
 Lemesurier, P., The Unknown Nostradamus (O Books, 2003)
 Wilson, I., Nostradamus: The Evidence (Orion, 2002)/ Nostradamus: The Man Behind the Prophecies (St Martin's 2007)
 Nostradamus' Recipe For Cherry Jelly

External links
Original text in facsimile
Selected extracts in English

1555 books
Nostradamus
Pharmacy